The Economists' Statement on Climate Change was published in 1997, prior to the Kyoto Protocol negotiated that same year, to promote market-based solutions to climate change.   It was signed by more than 2,600 economists, including 19 Nobel Prize laureates, and remains the largest public statement in the history of the economics profession.

The statement was coordinated by Redefining Progress, an environmental economics think tank founded by Ted Halstead.

Statement content
The statement published on 29 March 1997 read as follows:

Original drafters

Kenneth Arrow
Dale W. Jorgenson 
Paul Krugman
William Nordhaus
Robert Solow

Nobel Laureate signatories
Kenneth Arrow
Gérard Debreu
Lars Peter Hansen
John Harsanyi
Oliver Hart
James Heckman
Leonid Hurwicz
Lawrence Klein
Paul Krugman
Wassily Leontief 
Franco Modigliani
William Nordhaus
Alvin E. Roth
Thomas J. Sargent
Amartya Sen 
Robert Solow
Joseph Stiglitz 
James Tobin
Oliver E. Williamson

History and organization
The Economists' Statement on Climate Change was organized by Redefining Progress, an environmental economics think tank founded in 1993 by Ted Halstead, who served as its first executive director.  Economist Stephen DeCanio, at the time a senior research fellow at Redefining Progress, played an important role in the effort.

Halstead and Decanio approached the original drafters listed above, and worked with them to co-draft the statement, which was subsequently mailed to other economists.  The statement was released on March 29, 1997, in advance of the Kyoto Climate Change Conference of December 1997, which led to the Kyoto Protocol.  Redefining Progress ceased operations in 2008.

References

Economics and climate change